Yurenev is a Russian masculine surname, its feminine counterpart is Yureneva. It may refer to:

Rostislav Yurenev (1912–2002), Russian film critic and teacher
Konstantin Yurenev (1888–1938), Soviet politician and diplomat

Russian-language surnames